Andrea Mágori or Mrs. József Mágori (née Balogi; born 1 May 1952) is a Hungarian politician, member of the National Assembly (MP) for Makó (Csongrád County Constituency VII) from 2010 to 2014. She was a member of the Committee on Consumer Protection from 14 May 2010 to 5 May 2014, and Committee on Agriculture from 23 September 2013 to 5 May 2014.

References

1952 births
Living people
Hungarian educators
Hungarian women educators
Fidesz politicians
Members of the National Assembly of Hungary (2010–2014)
Women members of the National Assembly of Hungary
People from Makó
21st-century Hungarian women politicians